Skander Mansouri (born 23 July 1995) is a Tunisian tennis player.

Mansouri has a career high ATP singles ranking of world No. 238 achieved on 12 December 2022. He also has a career high ATP doubles ranking of world No. 209 achieved on 21 October 2019.

At the 2019 African Games he won the gold medal at the Men's doubles event with his fellow countryman Aziz Dougaz.

Career
Mansouri made his ATP main draw debut at the 2015 Winston-Salem Open in the doubles draw partnering Christian Seraphim.

Mansouri represents Tunisia at the Davis Cup where he has a W/L record of 10–2.

Challenger and Futures/World Tennis Tour finals

Singles: 25 (15-10)

Doubles: 32 (22–10)

Davis Cup

Participations: (10–2)

   indicates the outcome of the Davis Cup match followed by the score, date, place of event, the zonal classification and its phase, and the court surface.

Another finals

African Games

Doubles 1 (1 victory)

References

External links
 
 
 

1995 births
Living people
Tunisian male tennis players
Competitors at the 2019 African Games
African Games gold medalists for Tunisia
African Games medalists in tennis
African Games bronze medalists for Tunisia
Wake Forest Demon Deacons men's tennis players
21st-century Tunisian people